Secusio drucei is a moth in the subfamily Arctiinae. It was described by Walter Rothschild in 1933. It is found in Angola, Kenya and Uganda.

Subspecies
Secusio drucei drucei
Secusio drucei intensa Rothschild, 1933 (Uganda)

References

Moths described in 1933
Arctiini